Universal Network Objects (UNO) is the component model used in the OpenOffice.org and LibreOffice computer software application suites. It is interface-based and designed to offer interoperability between different programming languages, object models and machine architectures, on a single machine, within a LAN or over the Internet.

Users can implement or access UNO components from any programming language for which a language binding exists. Complete UNO language bindings exist for C++ (compiler-dependent), Java, Object REXX, Python, and Tcl. Bindings allowing access, but not writing, to components exist for StarOffice Basic, OLE Automation and the .NET Common Language Infrastructure. In particular, this API is used by macros.

Universal Network Objects operate within the UNO Runtime Environment (URE).

The Apache OpenOffice version of UNO is released under the terms Apache License (Version 2) as free and open source software.

UNO for function-calling 
Examples: an external program can export an ODT file as a PDF file, or import and convert a DOCX, calling LibreOffice by the UNO interface.  Another external program can access a cell and formulas from LibreOffice Calc file.

Application examples: Docvert, JODConverter, unoConv.

UNO for Add-Ons 
Programmers can write and integrate their own UNO components to OpenOffice/LibreOffice. Those components can be added to the LibreOffice menus and toolbars; they are called "Add-Ons".
The Add-Ons can extend the functionality of LibreOffice.

The integration of new components is supported by some tools and services. The three main steps are as follows:

Register the new components within LibreOffice. This can be accomplished using the tool unopkg.
Integrate the new components as services. The ProtocolHandler and JobDispatch services assist you.
Change the user interface (menus or toolbars). This can be done almost automatically by writing an XML text file that describes the changes.

Application example: jOpenDocument.

References

External links 

Apache OpenOffice
 UNO Development Kit project page
 Overview and technical details
 Java overview-summary
 OpenOffice.org Software Development Kit
 ODF Toolkit: Transition Steps
 Developer's Guide

LibreOffice
 see unoexe and unopkg
 Inside LibreOffice: Universal Network Objects

Language bridges (native for Java and Python)
 UNO for Object REXX
 UNO for PHP (written in C++)
 UNO for FreePascal/Delphi maybe orphaned

Object-oriented programming
OpenOffice